Aegocera is a genus of moths of the family Noctuidae first described by Pierre André Latreille in 1809.

Description
Palpi with second joint clothed with long hair. Antennae strongly dilated distally. Forewings with veins 3, 4, and 5 from close to angle of cell and vein 6 from upper angle. Veins 9 and 10 anastomosing with 7 and 8 to form areole. Hindwings lack vein 5.

Species
 Aegocera anthina Jordan, 1926
 Aegocera bettsi Wiltshire, 1988
 Aegocera brevivitta Hampson, 1901
 Aegocera bimacula Walker, 1854
 Aegocera ferrugo Jordan, 1926
 Aegocera fervida (Walker, 1854)
 Aegocera geometrica Hampson, 1910
 Aegocera humphreyi (Hampson, 1911)
 Aegocera jordani Kiriakoff, 1955
 Aegocera menete (Cramer, 1775)
 Aegocera naveli Le Cerf, 1922
 Aegocera obliqua Mabille, 1893
 Aegocera rectilinea Boisduval, 1836
 Aegocera tigrina (Druce, 1882)
 Aegocera tricolora Bethune-Baker, 1909
 Aegocera tripartita Kirby, 1880
 Aegocera venulia Cramer, [1777]

References

 

Agaristinae
Noctuoidea genera